Kalleh Chat (also Romanized as Kalleh Chāt) is a village in Birk Rural District, in the Central District of Mehrestan County, Sistan and Baluchestan Province, Iran. At the 2006 census, its population was 42, in 9 families.

References 

Populated places in Mehrestan County